Wilhelm Zenger (died 1911) was a German figure skater.

He won the title of German Champion in men's figure skating twice, in 1900 and 1901. He was the younger brother of Karl Zenger.

Competitive highlights in figure skating

References
Journal “Eis- und Rollsport”, 49th year, No. 9, 5 January 1939

German male single skaters
1877 births
1911 deaths
19th-century births